Alifereti Dere (born 29 September 1961) is a Fijian former rugby union footballer and coach. He played as a flanker.
Along with fellow Fijian rugby players Mesake Rasari, Niko Baleiverata, Fili Seru, Kinivuwai Ratuvio, Pita Naruma, Etuate Gusuivalu, Manasa Bari, Marika Vunibaka and Pauliasi Tabulutu, he gained widespread success in the sport of rugby. He played also for the Army Rugby Club, from Suva.

Career
His first international cap was against Wales, at Suva, on 31 March 1986. Although not taking part to the 1987 Rugby World Cup due to having departed the previous year, due to a tour of duty with Fiji troops in the United Nations' interim force in Lebanon. He was also part of the 1991 Rugby World Cup roster, where he played 3 matches. His last cap was during the World Cup pool match against Romania, at Brive-La-Gaillarde. He also captained Fiji Sevens in the 1990s.

Coaching career
Between 2010 and 2013, Dere was named as head coach of the Fiji national rugby sevens team, replacing Joe Savou. In 2011, his assistant coach Eluati Waqa replaced him as head coach during the Gold Coast sevens, as Dere was barred to enter in Australia due to his military background
.

Notes

External links

1961 births
Fijian rugby union players
Rugby union flankers
Living people
Fiji national rugby union team coaches
Fijian rugby union coaches
Fijian expatriate rugby union players
I-Taukei Fijian people
Fiji international rugby union players